Bellstane Birds Football Club was a Scottish association football club based in Queensferry, West Lothian. The club was founded in 1882 and disbanded in 1891. The club competed in the Scottish Cup for five seasons between 1886 and 1891. The club's home colours were red and blue.

References 

Defunct football clubs in Scotland
Association football clubs established in 1882
1882 establishments in Scotland
Association football clubs disestablished in 1891
1891 disestablishments in Scotland